Petra Matechová (born 8 December 1971) is a Czech luger. She competed in the women's singles event at the 1992 Winter Olympics.

References

1971 births
Living people
Czech female lugers
Olympic lugers of Czechoslovakia
Lugers at the 1992 Winter Olympics
Place of birth missing (living people)